Heinrich "Henri" Skiba (14 July 1927 – 11 March 2018) was a French football player and manager who played as a striker. Of German origin, he played for the France national team.

Skiba was born in German Upper Silesia. After World War II, as a refugee from Silesia, he was discovered by 1. FC Nürnberg when their "Oldies" team played a Bavarian non-league side in 1949. He was signed for the first team but appeared in only two Oberliga Süd matches in the early stages of 1949–50 before moving on to France and won his first full cap at 32. He moved to France in 1950, and became an international for the France national team.

He was manager in Switzerland and France.

He died in Limoges, France in March 2018.

References

External links
 
 
 Profile at French federation official site 
 Profile

1927 births
2018 deaths
Grasshopper Club Zürich managers
French footballers
Association football forwards
France international footballers
German footballers
German emigrants to France
Racing Besançon players
AS Monaco FC players
RC Strasbourg Alsace players
Nîmes Olympique players
FC Sochaux-Montbéliard players
Stade Français (association football) players
FC Nancy players
Ligue 1 players
Ligue 2 players
French football managers
FC La Chaux-de-Fonds managers
BSC Young Boys managers
Angoulême Charente FC managers
Limoges FC managers
FC Biel-Bienne managers
People from Bytom
People from the Province of Upper Silesia
World War II refugees